"Know You Will" is a song performed by Australian contemporary worship band Hillsong United. It was released on 9 July 2021, as the lead single from their sixth studio album, Are We There Yet? (2022). The song was written by Benjamin Hastings, Dylan Thomas, and Joel Houston. Michael Guy Chislett and Joel Houston handled the production of the single.

"Know You Will" peaked at No. 23 on the US Hot Christian Songs chart.  The song received a GMA Dove Award nomination for Worship Recorded Song of the Year at the 2022 GMA Dove Awards.

Background
Hillsong United released "Know You Will" as a single on 9 July 2021. Joel Houston shared the story behind the song, saying:

Composition

Accolades

Commercial performance
"Know You Will" debuted at number 23 on the US Hot Christian Songs chart dated 24 July 2021, concurrently debuting at number 48 on the Christian Airplay chart, and at number 16 on the Christian Digital Song Sales chart that same week.

Music videos
On 9 July 2021, Hillsong United released the official music video of "Know You Will" together with the lyric video via YouTube. The official acoustic performance video of the song was released on 27 August 2021, via YouTube.

Track listing

Personnel
Credits adapted from AllMusic.

 Adam Cattell — engineer
 Michael Guy Chislett — acoustic guitar, engineer, electric guitar, producer, recording
 Matt Crocker — background vocals
 Jonathan Douglass — background vocals
 Andrea García — A&R
 Taya Gaukrodger — background vocals
 Sam Gibson — mixing engineer
 Jad Gillies — background vocals
 Bruno Gruel — mastering engineer
 Benjamin Hastings — vocals
 Hillsong United — primary artist
 Joel Houston — executive producer, piano, producer
 Tahisha Hunt — background vocals
 Grant Konemann — engineer
 Daniel McMurray — drums, engineer, recording
 Johnny Rays — management
 Brendan Tan — percussion
 Ben Tennikoff — engineer, piano, programmer, recording
 Matt Tennikoff — bass
 Dylan Thomas — acoustic guitar, electric guitar, piano
 Ben Whincop — bass
 Michael Zuvela — engineer, recording

Charts

Weekly charts

Year-end charts

Release history

References

External links
 

2021 songs
2021 singles
Hillsong United songs